Jürgen Hermann Mayer (born 1965 in Stuttgart) is a German architect and artist. He is the leader of the architecture firm "J. MAYER H." in Berlin and calls himself Jürgen Mayer H.

Life and work
He studied at Stuttgart University, The Cooper Union and Princeton University. Since 1996 he has been working as an architect. Recent national and international projects include Metropol Parasol, the redevelopment of the Plaza de la Encarnación in Seville, Spain; the Court of Justice in Hasselt, Belgium; Pavilion KA300, built in celebration of Karlsruhe's 300th jubilee, and several public and infrastructural projects in Georgia—for example, an airport in Mestia, the border checkpoint in Sarpi, and three rest stops along the highway in Gori and Lochini. His work has been published and exhibited worldwide and is part of numerous collections including Museum of Modern Art (MoMA) New York and MoMA San Francisco and also private collections. National and international awards include the Mies-van-der-Rohe-Award-Emerging-Architect-Special-Mention-2003, Winner Holcim Award Bronze 2005 and Winner Audi Urban Future Award 2010. He has taught at Princeton University, Harvard University, Berlin University of the Arts, the Technical University of Munich, the Architectural Association in London, the Columbia University, New York City, at the University of Toronto, Canada, and has been a mentor at the international mentorship program Forecast, based in Berlin.

Firm
J. MAYER H. was founded 1996 in Berlin. Since January 2014, when Andre Santer and Hans Schneider joined as partners in the firm, it has been called J. Mayer H. und Partner, Architekten. It focuses on works at the intersection of architecture, communication, and new technology. From urban planning schemes and buildings, to installation work and objects with new materials, the relationship between the human body, technology, and nature form the background for a new production of space.

Important works (selection)
 Stadt.haus (Stadthalle Scharnhauser Park, Ostfildern), 2000–2002, exhibited in the Permanent Collection of Museum of Modern Art (MoMA) New York, the Biennial in Venice 2004, Arsenale and the German pavilion
 Rotor Penthouse, private building, Denmark, 2004–2006
 Mensa Moltke, Hochschule Karlsruhe, Germany, 2004–2007
 Metropol Parasol, redevelopment of the Plaza de la Encarnacion, Seville, Spain, 2004–2011
 ADA1, office building, Hamburg, Germany, 2005–2007
 Danfoss Universe, Nordborg, Denmark, 2005–2007
 Dupli.Casa, private house, near Ludwigsburg, Germany, 2005–2008
 S11, office building, Hamburg, Germany, 2007–2009.
 Highway Rest Stop 1 and 2, Gori and Lochini, Georgia, 2009 – 2011. 
 Border Checkpoint, Sarpi, Georgia, 2010–2011
 Queen Tamar Airport, Mestia, Georgia, 2010.
 JOH3, residential building, Johannisstraße 3, Berlin, Germany, 2009–2011
 Pier Sculpture, Lazika, Georgia, 2012
 Court of Justice, Hasselt Belgium, in cooperation with a2o-architecten and Lensºass architecten, 2005–13
 Schaustelle, space for experiments, Munich, Germany, 2012–2013
 Sonnenhof, office and residential buildings, Jena, Germany, 2008–2014
 FOM, Düsseldorf, University building, Düsseldorf, Germany, 2012–2015
 Pavilion KA300, pavilion for the city jubilee, Karlsruhe, Germany, 2014–2015
 XXX Times Square With Love, installation in New York's Times Square, 2016
IGZ Main Campus Building in Falkenburg, 2020

Awards (selection)
 Mies-van-der-Rohe Award for emerging architects, 2003 
 Holcim Award Bronze for the European region, 2005
 Audi Urban Future Award, 2010
 red dot design award, 2012, for Metropol Parasol
 Finalist European Union Prize for Contemporary Architecture, 2013 for Metropol Parasol

Exhibitions (selection)
 Vitra Design Museum, 2007: Housewarming MyHome
 San Francisco, Museum, 2009: Patterns of Speculation 
 La Biennale di Venezia, Italian pavilion, 2009: Pre.Text / Vor.Wand
 Global Design, Museum für Gestaltung, 2010: Pre.Text / Vor.Wand
 Showroom Euroboden, Munich, 2010: Re.Flecks
 Berlinische Galerie, 2011: RAPPORT. Experimentelle Raumstrukturen'
 Art Institute of Chicago, 2012: Wirrwarr 
 Galerie Eigen+Art, Berlin 2013: Black.See Lugadero, 2014: Retraro Robot Istanbul Design Biennial, 2014: NAP GAP Shenzhen Bi-City Biennial of Urbanism/Architecture, 2014: Border Warehouse InCITE Gallery, Bangalore, 2015: the work of J. Mayer H. Beijing Design Week, 2014: Exhibition Design+ Istanbul Biennale Exhibition, 2015: FIN-GER Ecola exhibition, 2015: Hands-onBibliography

 Architekturforum Aedes|Aedes Galerie und Architekturforum (ed.), Kristin Feireiss, Hans-Jürgen Commerell: J. Mayer H., surphase architecture. (exhibition catalogue). Aedes, Berlin 2002.
 Cristina Steingräber (ed.): metropol parasol, Staatliche Museen Berlin 2005, 
 Henry Urbach (ed.): J. Mayer H., Hatje Cantz, Ostfildern 2008, 
 Neeraj Bhatia, Jürgen Mayer H. (ed.): arium, Hatje Cantz, Ostfildern 2009, 
 Suh Kyong won (ed.): DD 19 Activators. DAMDI Architecture Publisher, Ostfildern 2011, 
 Berlinische Galerie (ed.): Rapport, 2011
 Andres Lepik, Andre Santer (ed.): metropol parasol, Hatje Cantz, Ostfildern 2011, 
 J. Mayer H., Cristina Steingräber (ed.): Wirrwarr, Hatje Cantz, Ostfildern 2011, 
 J. Mayer H. (ed.): A.WAY, Trademark Publishing 2011, .
 Wilko Hoffmann (ed.): Could Should Would, Hatje Cantz, Ostfildern 2015, 

 Film 
 Jürgen Mayer H. Der Architekt der Kurven. (Alternativtitel: J. Mayer H. – Architektur als Abenteuer.'') documentary film, Germany, 2011, 26 min., book and direction: Claudius Gehr, production: planetfilm, NDR, arte, first broadcast: 16 December 2012 by arte.

References

External links

1965 births
Living people
21st-century German architects
Architects from Stuttgart
Princeton University School of Architecture alumni
Cooper Union alumni